"The Whole World Is Watching" is the fourth episode of the American television miniseries The Falcon and the Winter Soldier, based on Marvel Comics featuring the characters Sam Wilson / Falcon and Bucky Barnes / Winter Soldier. It follows the pair as they continue to reluctantly work with Helmut Zemo to locate and stop the Flag Smashers. The episode is set in the Marvel Cinematic Universe (MCU), sharing continuity with the films of the franchise. It was written by Derek Kolstad and directed by Kari Skogland.

Anthony Mackie and Sebastian Stan reprise their respective roles as Sam Wilson and Bucky Barnes from the film series, with Emily VanCamp, Wyatt Russell, Erin Kellyman, Florence Kasumba, Adepero Oduye, and Daniel Brühl (Zemo) also starring. Development began by October 2018, and Skogland joined in May 2019. Kolstad was hired that July. The episode explores the complex morals of John Walker / Captain America (Russell) and depicts him publicly murdering an unarmed man, which acknowledges police brutality in the United States. Filming took place at Pinewood Atlanta Studios in Atlanta, Georgia, with location filming in the Atlanta metropolitan area and in Prague.

"The Whole World Is Watching" was released on the streaming service Disney+ on April 9, 2021. Critics praised the darker tone of the episode, and its portrayal of Walker led to discussion by commentators due to his violent actions as Captain America.

Plot 
Bucky Barnes is confronted by Ayo of the Dora Milaje, who has come for Helmut Zemo, the terrorist that killed their king T'Chaka. As Barnes broke Zemo out of prison to help him find the terrorist group, the Flag Smashers, Ayo gives Barnes eight hours to use Zemo before the Wakandans come for him. Barnes, Zemo, and Sam Wilson investigate a camp in Latvia where Flag Smasher sympathizers are housing and teaching people that were displaced when half of all life returned from the Blip.

Zemo discovers where a memorial service is being held for Donya Madani, the adoptive mother of the Flag Smashers' leader Karli Morgenthau. He, Wilson, and Barnes are confronted by John Walker / Captain America and his partner Lemar Hoskins, who Wilson convinces to let him speak to Morgenthau alone. Wilson attempts to persuade her to change her violent methods, but is interrupted by an impatient Walker, leading to a fight. Zemo shoots Morgenthau, causing her to drop vials of Super Soldier Serum, which he begins to smash. Walker stops Zemo and retrieves a single remaining vial while Morgenthau escapes.

Ayo and the Dora Milaje come for Zemo, but Walker refuses to hand him over. In the ensuing fight, Walker is humiliated while Zemo escapes. Walker later discusses the Super Soldier Serum with Hoskins, who suggests that Walker will always make the right decision and would be able to save lives if he had taken it. Morgenthau plans to divide the group and threatens Wilson's sister Sarah and her family to lure him and Barnes to a meeting. Meanwhile, Walker and Hoskins attack other Flag Smashers. Wilson and Barnes rush to find them, leading to another fight wherein Wilson realizes that Walker has taken the serum.

Morgenthau follows Wilson and Barnes and joins the fight, accidentally killing Hoskins. Enraged by his friend's death, Walker chases down one of the Flag Smashers, Nico, and uses his shield to violently beat him to death. With Nico's blood on the shield, Walker realizes that he is surrounded by horrified bystanders who have filmed his actions, including Wilson, Barnes, and Morgenthau.

Production

Development 
By October 2018, Marvel Studios was developing a limited series starring Anthony Mackie's Sam Wilson / Falcon and Sebastian Stan's Bucky Barnes / Winter Soldier from the Marvel Cinematic Universe (MCU) films. Malcolm Spellman was hired as head writer of the series, which was announced as The Falcon and the Winter Soldier in April 2019. Spellman modeled the series after buddy films that deal with race, such as 48 Hrs. (1982), The Defiant Ones (1958), Lethal Weapon (1987), and Rush Hour (1998). Kari Skogland was hired to direct the miniseries a month later, and executive produced alongside Spellman and Marvel Studios' Kevin Feige, Louis D'Esposito, Victoria Alonso, and Nate Moore. Derek Kolstad joined the writing team in July 2019, and revealed in March 2021 that he had written the fourth episode, which is titled "The Whole World Is Watching". This references the phrase chanted by anti-Vietnam War protestors at an incident in Chicago during the 1968 Democratic National Convention. The episode was released on the streaming service Disney+ on April 9, 2021.

Writing 
The Wakanda flashback had "a lot of thought" go into it, since Spellman knew the moment was "at least 80 years in the making for the character" and the "gravitas" needed to be felt. The episode discusses some of the PTSD that John Walker / Captain America suffers from, with actor Wyatt Russell explaining that circumstances surrounding the character's Medals of Honor represent failure to him and his attempts to right those wrongs are making things worse. Russell discussed the character with one of the series' trainers who was a former Marine, and he suggested Russell listen to an interview with Medal of Honor-winning Marine Dakota Meyer as research for the character. Russell felt Walker was the kind of character that is needed when fighting a war, but can sometimes go "overboard", which is how he described Walker's killing of Nico at the end of the episode. He added that Nico "didn't deserve to be killed by a shield. But he's a bad guy." Russell also compared the character to an "overzealous cop" who uses "excessive force to get what he wants done" which is not acceptable in modern society, referencing police brutality in the United States. Russell said the U.S. government was Walker's family, and they have trained him to be a killer through his military background, so there is a robotic quality to Walker when he kills Nico because he is just doing his job without thinking about the moral implications.

Discussing the symbolism of the episode's final scene, Moore said the characters in the series were all trying to come to terms with the difference between reality and ideals, and Captain America's shield represents some of those ideals since it previously belonged to Steve Rogers who represented doing the right thing. Moore felt seeing the shield covered in blood was inherently impactful due to the blood covering a symbol of those ideals, and noted that fans had a visceral reaction to that when the episode was released. He also said a central idea of the series was exploring what it means to be American and patriotic, especially from the perspective of Wilson, and he felt that to do so honestly they could not ignore the imagery of an American symbol being used to kill an unarmed man. Spellman felt this was an inevitable conclusion for the series to draw and was not done out of any agenda, feeling that the series would have been criticized if it tried to avoid such difficult topics. Mackie acknowledged that the shield has been used as a weapon in the MCU before, but never in a public and non-heroic way like this, and he said the use of blood adds effect to the scene since previous MCU films rarely show blood during action scenes. Actress Adepero Oduye added that "sometimes people need to see blood for it to get real" and felt the scene was the point where people could not be oblivious to reality anymore.

Casting 
The episode stars Anthony Mackie as Sam Wilson, Sebastian Stan as Bucky Barnes, Emily VanCamp as Sharon Carter, Wyatt Russell as John Walker / Captain America, Erin Kellyman as Karli Morgenthau, Florence Kasumba as Ayo, Adepero Oduye as Sarah Wilson, and Daniel Brühl as Helmut Zemo. Also appearing are Clé Bennett as Lemar Hoskins / Battlestar, Desmond Chiam, Dani Deetté, and Indya Bussey as the Flag Smashers Dovich, Gigi, and DeeDee, respectively, Renes Rivera as Lennox, Tyler Dean Flores as Diego, Noah Mills as Nico, Janeshia Adams-Ginyard as Nomble, Zola Williams as Yama, and Veronica Falcón as Donya Madani.

Filming and visual effects 
Filming took place at Pinewood Atlanta Studios in Atlanta, Georgia, with Skogland directing, and P.J. Dillon serving as cinematographer. Location filming took place in the Atlanta metropolitan area and in Prague. Visual effects for the episode were created by Tippett Studio, QPPE, Rodeo FX, Crafty Apes, Cantina Creative, and Digital Frontier FX.

Music 
Selections from composer Henry Jackman's score for the episode were included in the series' Vol. 2 soundtrack album, which was released digitally by Marvel Music and Hollywood Records on April 30, 2021.

Marketing 
On March 19, 2021, Marvel announced a series of posters that were created by various artists to correspond with the episodes of the series. The posters were released weekly ahead of each episode, with the fourth poster, designed by Tracie Ching, being revealed on April 8. After the episode's release, Marvel announced merchandise inspired by the episode as part of its weekly "Marvel Must Haves" promotion for each episode of the series, including apparel and accessories.

Reception

Audience viewership 
Nielsen Media Research, who measure the number of minutes watched by United States audiences on television sets, listed The Falcon and the Winter Soldier as the second most-watched original series across streaming services for the week of April 5 to 11, 2021. Between the first four episodes, which were available at the time, the series had 748 million minutes viewed.

Critical response 
The review aggregator website Rotten Tomatoes reported a 91% approval rating with an average score of 7.8/10 based on 34 reviews. The site's critical consensus reads, "A darker installment that delivers tons of character development, 'The World is Watching' sets the stage for an epic–if potentially crowded–final stretch."

Giving the episode a 9 out of 10, Matt Purslow of IGN found the episode to be "the darkest, most serious chapter of the run so far", praising its focus on series matters and how that allowed a deeper exploration of the motivations of characters such as Walker and Morgenthau. He was critical of how the series was handling the reaction to the Blip, notably with the Flag Smashers' reaction to the GRC and the "somewhat incomplex" appearance of the Dora Milaje, but he did regard the resulting fight sequence with the Dora Milaje as notable for its psychological impact on Walker. Purslow concluded that, while the episode marked a "sudden diversion from the buddy comedy style that the previous chapters had been building", the darker tone allowed it to tell its story with the "adequate weight the show's themes demand". Sulagna Misra at The A.V. Club, giving the episode an "A−", wrote that "The Whole World Is Watching" returned to the emotional through line from the first two episodes. She praised Russell's acting in the episode, stating how he was able to strike "an amazing balance between John's frustrations and fears", and highlighted the appearance of the Dora Milaje and the production design of Donya Madani's funeral. Rolling Stones Alan Sepinwall believed Stan had strong acting moments in the opening Wakanda flashback, calling his portrayal of Barnes' emotions "so palpable". In addition, he felt that the shot of the Dora Milaje holding Captain America's shield was "among the more memorable images this show has given us" despite it lasting only a few seconds.

Christian Holub of Entertainment Weekly gave the episode a "B" and believed Zemo discussing with Wilson and Barnes about those who seek out superpowers was a "fascinating conversation", with the fight between the Dora Milaje and John Walker being his favorite scene. Brian Tallerico of Vulture gave the episode 4 out of 5 stars, saying it was setting up a story about "what exactly it means to be a hero in 2021" and felt the series was "one of the most morally complex productions" of the MCU. However, he was critical of the death of Lemar Hoskins, a Black person, as an example of fridging as it was used to further the story arc of John Walker. Writing for IndieWire, Leonardo Adrian Garcia was less positive about the episode, giving it a "C+". He found it to be less exciting than the previous episodes due to the focus on Morgenthau and Walker, and felt its pacing was "strangely slow". In particular, he called the focus on John Walker a "slog", adding that everything with the character "comes off as one-note". Garcia hoped the final two episodes would see the series return to its buddy cop format, be "chockfull of action", and tie up plot threads. However, Garcia did enjoy the Wakanda opening and appearance of the Dora Milaje, saying that, like WandaVision, the series was "delivering on the grief and trauma fronts".

Notes

References

External links 
 
 Episode recap at Marvel.com
 Wakanda Featurette on YouTube

2021 American television episodes
The Falcon and the Winter Soldier episodes
Television episodes about funerals
Television episodes set in Riga
Television episodes set in Africa
Television episodes set in Asia
Television episodes set on fictional islands
Television episodes written by Derek Kolstad
Television episodes set in the 2010s
Television episodes set in the 2020s